Bazargan District is in Maku County, West Azerbaijan province, Iran. At the 2006 National Census, its population (as a part of the Central District) was 20,342 in 4,098 households. The following census in 2011 counted 18,730 people in 4,486 households, by which time Chaybasar-e Shomali Rural District and the city of Bazargan  had been separated from the Central District to form Bazargan District. At the latest census in 2016, the district had 19,676 inhabitants in 5,519 households.

References 

Maku County

Districts of West Azerbaijan Province

Populated places in West Azerbaijan Province

Populated places in Maku County